Ian Mofford is a former Grey Cup champion wide receiver and running back who played nine seasons in the Canadian Football League, winning two Grey Cup Championships.

Mofford, a Notre-Dame-de-Grâce native who played for Monklands High School and the Verdun Maple Leafs, began his CFL career with the Montreal Alouettes, playing 6 seasons and 79 games (up to 1979) and won 2 Grey Cup championships, in 1974 and 1977. He later joined the Ottawa Rough Riders for one season, the Winnipeg Blue Bombers for two seasons, and returned to the Als in 1981, playing 3 games. His last year was 1982, when he played 4 games for the woeful Montreal Concordes.

References

External links
Brodie Snyder, Alouette Rookie Ian Mofford Makes A Lot Of People Believe, The Montreal Gazette - Aug 27, 1974
FANBASE BIO

1954 births
Living people
People from Côte-des-Neiges–Notre-Dame-de-Grâce
Canadian football people from Montreal
Montreal Alouettes players
Ottawa Rough Riders players
Winnipeg Blue Bombers players
Montreal Concordes players
Players of Canadian football from Quebec
Anglophone Quebec people